Uncieburia is a genus of beetles in the family Cerambycidae, containing the following species:

 Uncieburia nigricans (Gounelle, 1909)
 Uncieburia quadrilineata (Burmeister, 1865)
 Uncieburia rogersi (Bates, 1870)

References

Eburiini